Jane Moubray is a British philatelist who was formerly president of the Royal Philatelic Society London. Moubray signed the Roll of Distinguished Philatelists in 1997.

Moubray was elected the first female President of the Royal Philatelic Society in 1996.

References 

British philatelists
Presidents of the Royal Philatelic Society London
Living people
Year of birth missing (living people)
Signatories to the Roll of Distinguished Philatelists
Women philatelists